The individual show jumping at the 1988 Summer Olympics took place between 26 September and 2 October at the Seoul Olympic Stadium. It featured a significant change to the competition format from prior years. The event was open to men and women. There were 74 competitors from 24 nations. Each nation could have up to 4 riders, up from 3 in previous years (though only a maximum of 3 could advance to the final). The event was won by Pierre Durand Jr. of France, the nation's first victory in individual jumping since 1964 and fourth overall—most of any nation, moving out of a tie with Italy at three. Silver went to Greg Best of the United States, with bronze to Karsten Huck of West Germany.

Background

This was the 18th appearance of the event, which had first been held at the 1900 Summer Olympics and has been held at every Summer Olympics at which equestrian sports have been featured (that is, excluding 1896, 1904, and 1908). It is the oldest event on the current programme, the only one that was held in 1900. The team and individual events remained separated, as they had been starting in 1968.

Five of the top 10 riders from the 1984 Games returned: gold medalist Joseph Fargis of the United States, fourth-place finisher Mario Deslauriers of Canada, sixth-place finisher Luis Álvarez de Cervera of Spain, seventh-place finisher Frédéric Cottier of France, and tenth-place finisher Luis Astolfi of Spain. The field was considered open, with top riders (including 1986 World Champion Gail Greenough of Canada and 1987 World Cup winner Katharine Burdsall of the United States) not competing.

Colombia and Liechtenstein each made their debut in the event. France competed for the 16th time, most of any nation.

Competition format

The competition underwent a significant format change, adding a two-round qualifying round before the two-round final. The course was 770 metres long, with jumps up to 1.60 metres high, a 2.00 metre oxer, and a 4.60 metre water jump.

In the qualifying round, each pair performed in two rounds. There was no elimination between the two rounds of the qualifying. Positive scoring, rather than the fault system, was used for the qualifying round. The total score for the two rounds in qualifying was used to determined advancement to the final. A maximum of 50% of the pairs could advance (37 of the 74 starters), with each nation limited to three riders advancing.

The final also consisted of two rounds. This time, however, there was a cut between the two rounds; only the top 20 advanced from the first round of the final to the second. Both rounds of the final used the typical fault system of scoring. The combined score for both rounds determined the placement. A jump-off would be used if necessary to break ties for medal positions; other ties would not be broken.

Schedule

All times are Korea Standard Time adjusted for daylight savings (UTC+10)

Results

Bourdy (France), Brinkmann (West Germany), and Pyrah (Great Britain) did not advance due to the limit of three pairs per nation. Bourdy was tied for 8th in the qualifying round; Cottier and Durand had lower scores than him but advanced instead. Durand, 18th overall and 4th among French riders in qualifying, ran both rounds of the final without any jumping penalties and finished with a total of 1.25 faults from time to win the gold medal. Huck had led the first round of the final, with a completely clean run (0 faults) to Durand's 0.25 time faults, and went last in the second round of the final knowing that Durand had reached the 1.25 total. Huck nearly made the second round clean as well, but hit the next-to-last rail to receive 4 faults—tied with Best for second, who had had 4 in the first round but was clean in the second. In the jump-off, both Huck and Best had 4 faults again; the silver medal went to the American based on time in the jump-off.

References

Equestrian at the 1988 Summer Olympics